Buggie may refer to: 
 A baby carriage, pram or shopping cart
 Haufe HA-G-1 Buggie, an American glider design
 Buggie, the mascot of Bugzilla

See also 
 Buggy (disambiguation)
 Boogie (disambiguation)
 Bogie (disambiguation)
 Bougie (disambiguation)